

249001–249100 

|-id=010
| 249010 Abdel-Samad ||  || Hamed Abdel-Samad (born 1972) is an Egyptian political scientist whose satirical German TV series "Safary through Germany" has initiated a broad national discussion. || 
|-id=044
| 249044 Barrymarshall ||  || Barry Marshall (born 1951), an Australian microbiologist and Nobel laureate || 
|-id=061
| 249061 Antonyberger ||  || Antony R. Berger (born 1937), a Canadian geologist who has helped launch many international scientific NGOs, including the Association of Geoscientists for International Development. He has authored over 130 publications in earth science, science policy and environmental issues. || 
|}

249101–249200 

|-id=160
| 249160 Urriellu ||  || The Picu Urriellu (a.k.a. Naranjo de Bulnes), a limestone peak of the Picos de Europa in northern Spain || 
|}

249201–249300 

|-id=300
| 249300 Karenmortfield || 2008 UY || Karen Mortfield (born 1958) is a Canadian public affairs specialist. As a volunteer, she played a leadership role in the renaissance of the David Dunlap Observatory in Canada, working from 2009–2017 to repurpose the 80-year old Observatory as a space science campus. || 
|}

249301–249400 

|-id=302
| 249302 Ajoie ||  || Ajoie, a region in the canton of Jura, Switzerland, that corresponds to the Porrentruy District, located north of the Swiss Jura || 
|}

249401–249500 

|-bgcolor=#f2f2f2
| colspan=4 align=center | 
|}

249501–249600 

|-id=514
| 249514 Donaldroyer ||  || Donald Royer (born 1942), an expert in the systems needed to operate and communicate with NASA space missions. He served as the mission operations systems manager for the WISE mission. || 
|-id=515
| 249515 Heinrichsen ||  || Ingolf Heinrichsen (born 1964), an expert in the systems engineering, operations, and management of space telescopes, including the Kepler mission, the Wide-field Infrared Survey Explorer and the Spitzer Space Telescope || 
|-id=516
| 249516 Aretha ||  || Aretha Franklin (born 1942), an American singer known as the Queen of Soul who has won 17 Grammy Awards and has influenced countless singers || 
|-id=519
| 249519 Whitneyclavin ||  || Whitney Clavin (born 1971), a science writer who works to inform the public about results from NASA astronomy missions such as Spitzer, Kepler and WISE || 
|-id=520
| 249520 Luppino ||  || Gerard A. Luppino (1959–2016) was an astronomer at the University of Hawaii, where he pioneered the construction of large-format mosaic CCD cameras for astronomy. He later formed GL Scientific, a company that fabricated instruments for many telescopes and space experiments. || 
|-id=521
| 249521 Truth ||  || Sojourner Truth (c. 1797–1883), an American abolitionist and advocate for women's rights || 
|-id=522
| 249522 Johndailey ||  || John Dailey (born 1978), a software engineer who was the lead developer for the Wide-field Infrared Survey Explorer's moving object processing system for identifying minor planets in the project's infrared images || 
|-id=523
| 249523 Friedan ||  || Betty Friedan (1921–2006), an author and social activist who wrote The Feminine Mystique, a book that made an enormous impact on women's lives. || 
|-id=530
| 249530 Ericrice ||  || Eric Rice (born 1979), a systems engineer specializing in fault protection. He has served as the fault protection engineer for several NASA spacecraft, including the Wide-field Infrared Survey Explorer || 
|-id=539
| 249539 Pedrosevilla ||  || Pedro Sevilla (born 1967), an engineer who worked on the payload electronics and focal planes of the Wide-field Infrared Survey Explorer mission || 
|-id=540
| 249540 Eugeniescott ||  || Eugenie Scott (born 1946), an American physical anthropologist || 
|-id=541
| 249541 Steinem ||  || Gloria Steinem (born 1934), a writer and journalist who co-founded Ms. Magazine and the Ms. Foundation for Women || 
|-id=544
| 249544 Ianmclean ||  || Ian McLean (born 1949), a professor of astronomy at the University of California, Los Angeles || 
|}

249601–249700 

|-bgcolor=#f2f2f2
| colspan=4 align=center | 
|}

249701–249800 

|-bgcolor=#f2f2f2
| colspan=4 align=center | 
|}

249801–249900 

|-bgcolor=#f2f2f2
| colspan=4 align=center | 
|}

249901–250000 

|-bgcolor=#f2f2f2
| colspan=4 align=center | 
|}

References 

249001-250000